The 2012 season was Santos Futebol Clube's 100th season in existence and the club's fifty-third consecutive season in the top flight of Brazilian football.

Santos won the Campeonato Paulista title for the third consecutive time and became the first team in 43 years to win three straight São Paulo state championships. Neymar was the top scorer and the best player.

They also competed in the Libertadores as the defending champions, exiting in the semi-finals after a 1–2 aggregate loss against eventual winners Corinthians.

On 26 September, Santos beat Universidad de Chile with an aggregate of 2–0 to win the Recopa Sudamericana for the first time.

Santos' youth team won the U20 Campeonato Paulista by beating São Paulo 2–0 on aggregate score.

Santos finished the Campeonato Brasileiro in eighth place after winning their last match 3–1 against Palmeiras on 1 December.

Key events

5 January: Santos announce that Nike Inc. will become club's official kit supplier.
9 January: Neymar wins 2011 FIFA Puskás Goal of the Year Award.
19 January: Neymar named best soccer player in South America in 2011.
28 January: Highest scorer in NBA history, Kareem Abdul-Jabbar visits Santos' training ground and plays football with Neymar.
2 February: Léo reaches 400 matches as Santos' player.
3 February: Santos release new kit produced by Nike Inc.
5 February: Neymar scores his 100th goal as professional footballer.
10 February: Uruguayan right back Fucile joins the club from Porto on a one-year loan deal.
24 February: Santos launch centenary' clock at Santos beach.
12 March: Neymar participates a charity dinner with Prince Harry.
27 March: The movie "Santos, 100 years of football art" is released in Brazilians theaters
4 April: Editora Magma Cultural release the book "Santos, 100 years of football art".
14 April: Santos centenary birthday.
14 April: Santos release new third kit.
29 April: Neymar scores his 100th goal as Santos' player
10 May: Neymar scores his 105th and 106th career goals with Santos, becoming the team's top scorer in the post-Pele era.
5 July: Rafael, Neymar and Ganso are included in the Brazil squad for the 2012 Summer Olympics.
16 July: Santos' coach, Muricy Ramalho renew his contract until December 2013.
24 July: Konami announces Vila Belmiro as the first Brazilian stadium in Pro Evolution Soccer's history.
19 August: Muricy Ramalho completes 100 matches as Santos' coach.
14 September: Santos release new away kit.
29 October: Neymar shortlisted for FIFA Ballon d’Or 2012.
3 November: Cruzeiro's fans applaud and chant Neymar's name after a hat-trick and an assist at the Estádio Independência.
14 November: Neymar nominated for FIFA Puskás Award 2012.

Players

Squad information

Appearances and goals

1Player was loaned

Last updated: 1 December 2012Source: Match reports in competitive matches, Santos FC, ESPN Soccernet, Soccerway

Goalscorers

Last updated: 1 December 2012
Source: Match reports in Competitive matches

Disciplinary record

Copa Libertadores squad
As of 14 February 2012, according to combined sources on the official website.
In Conmebol competitions players must be assigned numbers between 1 and 25.

1Pará, Ibson and Vinicius Simon left the club during the competition, and for their places, Maranhão, Gérson Magrão and Ewerton Páscoa were entered.

Recopa Sudamericana squad
As of 20 August 2012, according to combined sources on the official website.
In Conmebol competitions players must be assigned numbers between 1 and 25.

Club

Coaching staff

Other staff

Club officials

Kit
The previous season kit was used until April due an agreement that Santos had with Umbro.

The home kit was released on 3 February 2012. Later, on 14 April 2012, Santos' centenary birthday, the third kit was released with the "sea color". The third kit was used as away kit until 14 October 2012, when the traditional away kit with black and white stripes was released in the match against Vasco valid for the 2013 Campeonato Brasileiro.

Official sponsorship

 Banco BMG
 Seara
 Netshoes
 CSU CardSystem 
 Marabraz.

Transfers

In

Out

 1: Included in David Braz and Rafael Galhardo transfers.
 2: Included in Ezequiel Miralles transfer.

Out on loan

Competitions

Overall summary

Detailed overall summary

{|class="wikitable" style="text-align: center;"
|-
!
!Total
! Home
! Away
|-
|align=left| Games played          || 75 || 38 || 37
|-
|align=left| Games won             || 36 || 24 || 12
|-
|align=left| Games drawn           || 20 || 10 || 10
|-
|align=left| Games lost            || 19 || 4 || 15
|-
|align=left| Biggest win           || 8–0 v Bolívar || 8–0 v Bolívar || 4–0 v Cruzeiro
|-
|align=left| Biggest loss          || 0–3 v Náutico || 1–3 v Bahia1–3 v Portuguesa || 0–3 Náutico
|-
|align=left| Clean sheets          || 27 || 18 || 9
|-
|align=left| Goals scored          || 133 || 84 || 49
|-
|align=left| Goals conceded        || 75 || 32 || 43
|-
|align=left| Goal difference       || +58 || +52 || +6
|-
|-
|-
|align=left| Yellow cards         || 169 || 78 || 91
|-
|align=left| Red cards           || 5 || 2 || 3
|-
|align=left| Most appearances     || align=center| Durval (63) ||align=center|Durval (37) ||align=center|Arouca (27)
|-
|align=left| Top scorer          || align=center| Neymar (43) || align=center| Neymar (24) || align=center| Neymar (19)
|-
|align=left|Worst discipline      ||align=center| Juan (12)  (2)  ||align=center| Adriano (8)  ||align=center| Juan (8)  (2) 
|-
|align=left| Points               || 128/225 (%) || 82/114 (%) || 46/111 (%)
|-
|align=left| Winning rate         || (%) || (%) || (%)
|-

Recopa Sudamericana

Campeonato Brasileiro

League table

Results summary

Results by round

Matches

Campeonato Paulista

Results summary

First stage

League table

Results by round

Matches

Knockout stage

Quarter-final

Semi-final

Finals

Copa Libertadores

Group stage

Knockout stage

Round of 16

Quarter-finals

Semi-finals

Notes

References

External links
Official Site 
Official Youtube Channel 

2012
Santos F.C.